Edewecht (Low German: Erwech) is a municipality in the Ammerland district, in Lower Saxony, Germany.

Villages in the municipality and their population

Friedrichsfehn Nord	1,747
Friedrichsfehn Süd	3,185
Husbäke	1,005 (known for the bog bodies found there; see: List of bog bodies)
Jeddeloh I	1,101
Jeddeloh II	1,333
Kleefeld	439
Klein Scharrel	1,229
Nord Edewecht I 2,246
Nord Edewecht II 2,548
Osterscheps	1,604
Portsloge	1,962
Süddorf	          608
Süd Edewecht	2,256
Westerscheps	554
Wildenloh	805
Wittenberge	386

total:	23,008

Edewecht only	7,050
Friedrichsfehn only	4,932

Source: website of the Edewecht Municipality.

Date: June 30, 2020.

The population figures include people, who have a second home in Edewecht besides to a dwelling elsewhere, and legally residing foreigners.

History
Edewecht was the scene of severe fights during the last weeks of the Second World War. Coming from Friesoythe in the south, on April 17, 1945, Canadian troops had to conquer Edewecht in fierce house-by-house fighting against fanatic German paratroopers and other soldiers. The famous German artist Joseph Beuys, who was a young man in these days, was one of the Wehrmacht paratroopers defending Edewecht, and got injured on April, 27 during battle.

This battle was the fifth time that Edewecht was destroyed in a war. The first four times were in the 15th and 16th centuries. Edewecht had been a border watch location between Eastern Frisia and the County of Oldenburg for many centuries.

Twin towns
Edewecht is twinned with
  Krosno in Poland  (since 1996) 
  Wusterhausen/Dosse in Brandenburg  Germany

Sons and daughters 
 Hein ten Hoff (1919-2003),  German boxer

References
Notes

Ammerland